The following is a list of cooking shows.

0-9
 30 Minute Meals - educational

A
 Alive and Cooking - educational
America's Test Kitchen - educational

B
 Baking with Julia - educational
 Barbecue America - educational
 Barefoot Contessa - educational
 Beat Bobby Flay - competition 
 Best Recipes Ever - educational
 The Best Thing I Ever Ate - educational
 Big Daddy's House - educational
 Binging with Babish - educational

C
 Cake Wars
 Can't Cook, Won't Cook - competition
 Celebrity Cooking Showdown - competition
 Chef at Home
 Chef Boy Logro: Kusina Master - educational
 Chef's Story - talk show
 Chef's Table - TV series
 Chefs A' Field - talk show
 The Chew - talk show
 Chinese Food Made Easy
 Chocolate with Jacques Torres
 Chopped
 Chopped: Canada
 Chopped Junior
 Cocineros argentinos
 Come Dine with Me
 Con las manos en la masa
 ...Cooks!
 Cook Yourself Thin
 Cook's Country from America's Test Kitchen - educational
 Cookin' Cheap
 Cooking for Dads - educational
 Cooking Live
Cooking with Dog - educational
 Cooking with Master Chefs: Hosted by Julia Child - educational
 Cooks vs. Cons
 Cottage Country: Chef Ted Reader
 Cupcake Wars
 Cutthroat Kitchen

D
 Daisy Cooks!
 Dinner and a Movie
 Dinner: Impossible
 Dione Lucas' Gourmet Club
 Domestic Goddess
 Down Home with the Neelys

E
 East Meets West
 El gran premio de la cocina
 Emeril Green
 Emeril Live
 Epic Meal Time
 Essence of Emeril
 Essential Pépin
 Everyday Italian

F
 The F Word (UK)
 The F Word (US)
 The Final Table
 Food and Drink
 Food Poker
 The French Chef
 Fresh with the Australian Women's Weekly
 The Frugal Gourmet

G
 The Galloping Gourmet
 Get Stuffed
 Giada at Home
 Glutton for Punishment
 Good Chef Bad Chef
 Good Eats
Gordon Ramsay: Cookalong Live (UK)
Gordon Ramsay's 24 Hours to Hell & Back
Gordon Ramsay's Home Cooking (UK)
Gordon Ramsay's Ultimate Cookery Course (UK)
 Gordon's Great Escape
 The Gourmet Next Door
 The Great British Bake Off - competition
 Great British Menu
 Great Chefs
 Great Food Live
 Greatest Dishes in the World
 Guy's Big Bite
 Guy's Grocery Games

H
 The Hairy Bikers' Cookbook
 The Hairy Bikers' Food Tour of Britain
 Have Fork, Will Travel
 Hell's Kitchen
 Hippy Gourmet
 Holiday Baking Championship
 How to Boil Water

I
 In the Kitchen with Stefano Faita
 Inside Dish
 Iron Chef (Japan)
 Iron Chef America
 Iron Chef Australia
 Iron Chef Canada
 Iron Chef Gauntlet
 Iron Chef Showdown
 Iron Chef UK
 Iron Chef USA
 Iron Chef Vietnam

J
Jacques Pépin: Fast Food My Way - educational
Jacques Pépin: Heart and Soul - educational
 Jamie at Home
 Joanne Weir's Cooking Class - educational
 Joyce Chen Cooks
 Julia & Jacques Cooking at Home - educational
 Junior MasterChef

K
 The Kitchen
 Kitchen Criminals
 Kitchen Nightmares
 Kitchen Superstar
 Khana Khazana by Sanjeev Kapoor

L
 Lidia's Kitchen
 Local Food Hero
 Louisiana Cookin'''

M
 Martha MasterChef (UK)
 MasterChef (US)
 MasterChef Australia MasterChef Canada MasterChef Junior MasterChef USA Mexico: One Plate at a Time My Kitchen Rules (Australia)
 My Kitchen Rules (NZ)
 My Kitchen Rules (US)
 My Kitchen Rules (SA)
 My Kitchen Rules (UK)
 Mary's Kitchen Crush (CA)

N
 Nadia G's Bitchin' Kitchen The Naked Chef The Naughty Kitchen with Chef Blythe Beck New Southern Cooking New Scandinavian Cooking The Next Iron Chef The Next Iron Chef Vietnam Nigella Bites Nigella Express No Kitchen RequiredO
 Oliver's TwistP
 Party Line with The Hearty Boys Paula's Best Dishes Paula's Home Cooking Post Punk KitchenQ
 Quick Fix Meals with Robin Miller Quickfire: The 10-minute Kitchen WondersR
 Rachael Ray Rachael vs. Guy: Celebrity Cook-Off Rachael Ray's Kids Cook-Off Rachael Ray's Tasty Travels Ramsay's Kitchen Nightmares Rasoi Show Ready Set Cook Ready Steady Cook 
 Ricardo and Friends Rock DinnerS
 Sarap Diva Saturday Kitchen Selena + Chef Simply Ming Sorted Food Sugar Rush Sunday Feast The Surreal Gourmet Sweet GeniusT
  Taste, hosted by  David Rosengarten
 Taste in Translation
 Ten Dollar Dinners
 Throwdown! with Bobby Flay
 Top Chef
 Top Chef Masters
 Turn Up the Heat with G. Garvin
 Two Fat Ladies
The Place To Eat

U
 Unwrapped
 The Urban Peasant

W
 We Can Cook Too! (cooking with Broadway stars, streaming on The STAGE Network)
 What Would Brian Boitano Make?
 What's Cooking?
 Wok with Yan
 Woman's World
 World Class Cuisine
 Worst Cooks in America

Y
 Yan Can Cook

References

Cooking